Nazir Ahmed (or Nazir Ahmad), OBE (1 May 1898 – 30 September 1973) was a Pakistani experimental physicist and the first chairman of the Pakistan Atomic Energy Commission (PAEC) from 1956 to 1960.

Dr.Nazir Ahmed was the first vice president of Pakistan central Contton Committe from 1948 to 1956.

Life
Nazir Ahmed was born in a Kakazai family. Ahmed obtained his B.Sc. in physics from Muhammadan Anglo-Oriental College, Aligarh, India in 1919. He attended the University of Cambridge, UK, under the supervision of Ernest Rutherford. There he received his M.Sc. in 1923, and PhD in experimental physics in 1925. 

In 1930, Nazir Ahmed came back to India, where he was appointed assistant director at the Technological Laboratory, Central Cotton Committee of India, and became its director after one year. While living in Bombay, he married Razia, a member of the Khader Nawaz Khan family of Madras and the Carnatic Sultanate; her sister Rafia married Ahmed's friend, the naval officer HMS Choudri.

On June 9, 1938, George VI appointed Ahmed an Officer of the Most Excellent Order of the British Empire.

In 1945, Ahmed was appointed member of the Indian Tariff Board. 

After the partition of India, Ahmed migrated to Karachi in Pakistan, where he held various positions, such as joint secretary of the Ministry of Economic Affairs and the Pakistan Development Board. In 1956, he became the first chairman of the Pakistan Atomic Energy Commission (PAEC), a post he held until 1960.

Nazir Ahmed was involved in efforts to build a heavy water plant at Multan, but the Pakistan Industrial Development Corporation turned down his request. In 1960, he was transferred to Ministry of Science and Technology under the administration of President Ayub Khan.

Fellowships 
 A 'Fellow' of the Pakistan Academy of Sciences (1953-1970).

Award named after Nazir Ahmad
To honor his services, Dr. Nazir Ahmad Award was named after him by the Pakistan Academy of Sciences.

Research papers 
Tubewell Theory and Practice, published by Pakistan Academy of Sciences - (Nazir Ahmed) (1979).
 Survey of Fuels & Electric Power Resources in Pakistan, published by Pakistan Academy Of Sciences - (Nazir Ahmed) (1972).

References 

1898 births
1973 deaths
Pashtun people
Pakistani physicists
Alumni of the Victoria University of Manchester
Nazir, Ahmed
Fellows of Pakistan Academy of Sciences
Chairpersons of the Pakistan Atomic Energy Commission
Presidents of the Pakistan Academy of Sciences